Rochelle Ballantyne (born 1995) is an American chess player. She is best known for appearing in the 2012 documentary Brooklyn Castle. Her USCF rating is 1988, putting her in the 99th percentile of American junior players. Her FIDE rating is 1912, with her highest rating achieved being 1954 in January 2012. According to the USCF's rating system, she is currently an "Expert" or "Candidate Master."

Biography
Raised in New York City, Rochelle Ballantyne learned to play chess through the Chess-in-the-Schools (CIS) program at PS 139 in Brooklyn. She continued with CIS in Middle School- she graduated from Intermediate School 318 (IS 318) and, later, Brooklyn Technical High School. Throughout her high school years at Brooklyn Tech, Rochelle was part of the Chess-in-the-Schools College Bound Program and she received special coaching from grandmaster instructors and academic tutoring and mentoring. During her freshman year (9th grade) at Brooklyn Tech, she won the 2012 All-Girls National Chess Championships, and was consequently awarded a full college scholarship to the University of Texas at Dallas; her story was featured in Brooklyn Castle. She later received a full scholarship to Stanford University, which she graduated from in 2017. She received an MA in education policy from Columbia University in 2020. In Fall 2020 she begins law school at New York University Law School, fully funded by the AnBryce Scholarship.

Chess
In 2008, at the age of 13, Ballantyne played against Garry Kasparov in a game known as "Harlem Shake".

In media
Ballantyne has appeared as herself in media.
Brooklyn Castle (2012)
Melissa Harris-Perry (2012)
The Jeff Probst Show (2013)
Harry (2017)

References

External links
 
 
 

American female chess players
1995 births
Living people
African-American chess players
21st-century African-American people
21st-century African-American women
Stanford University alumni